Băile Herculane is a spa town in Romanian Banat, in Caraș-Severin County, situated in the valley of the Cerna River, between the Mehedinți Mountains to the east and the Cerna Mountains to the west, elevation 168 meters. Its current population is approximately 5,000. The town administers one village, Pecinișca (from 1912 to 1918 Csernabesenyő).

History

The spa town of Băile Herculane has a long history of human habitation.  Numerous archaeological discoveries show that the area has been inhabited since the Paleolithic era.  The Peștera Hoților (Cave of the Thieves), contains multiple levels, including one from the Mousterian period, one from the Mesolithic period (late Epigravettian) and several from the later Neolithic periods.

Legend has it that the weary Hercules stopped in the valley to bathe and rest. Unearthed stone carvings show that visiting Roman aristocrats turned the town into a Roman leisure center. Six statues of Hercules from the time have been discovered.  A bronze replica of one of them, molded in 1874, stands as a landmark in the town center. Austrian and Ottoman troops clashed here after the Ottoman victory in the battle of Mehadia on 30 August 1788. The Ottomans won the skirmish, took the town on 7 September 1788 and advanced to Caransebeș. It was retaken by the Austrians at the end of September 1789.

Climate
Băile Herculane has a humid continental climate (Cfb in the Köppen climate classification).

The modern spa
In modern times, the spa town has been visited for its supposedly natural healing properties: hot springs with sulfur, chlorine, sodium, calcium, magnesium and other minerals, as well as negatively ionized air. Before World War II, when the first modern hotel was built (i.e. H Cerna, 1930) it remained a popular destination with Western Europeans. During the Communist era, mass tourism facilities were built, such as the 8- to 12-storied concrete hotels Roman, Hercules A, Hercules B, Afrodita, Minerva, Diana, UGSR, etc. which dominate the skyline. It was visited by all kinds of people but was especially popular with employees and retirees, who would spend their state-allotted vacation vouchers there, hoping to improve their health. Today, they share the town with a younger crowd. New privately owned pensions and hotels appeared after 1989, along the Cerna/Tiena river banks, spread from the train station to the end of the hydroelectrical dam. Some of the Austro-Hungarian era buildings have become derelict, including many of the baths, because of bad management after privatization. In the late 2010s, an NGO called the Herculane Project was established to stabilise the buildings and eventually restore them.

Natives
  (1833–1897), Swiss engineer, designer of the Martini–Henry rifle
 Vasile Didea (born 1954), Romanian boxer 
 Ferenc Szécsi (1913–1974), Hungarian stage and film actor

Image gallery

References

Populated places in Caraș-Severin County
Localities in Romanian Banat
Towns in Romania
Spa towns in Romania
Ski areas and resorts in Romania